The Irishman is a 2019 American epic crime film directed by Martin Scorsese.

The Irishman may also refer to:

 The Irishman (1978 film), an Australian romantic drama, based on the novel
 The Irishman (novel), by Elizabeth O'Conner, 1960
 Frank Sheeran, nicknamed "The Irishman", an American labor union leader, subject of the 2019 film

See also
 I Heard You Paint Houses, a 2004 work of narrative nonfiction about Frank "The Irishman" Sheeran
 Irish people